The fruithunter or fruit-hunter (Chlamydochaera jefferyi), also known as the black-breasted fruit-hunter, is an enigmatic species of bird currently placed with the typical thrushes in the family Turdidae. It is endemic to forests on the south-east Asian island of Borneo.

It is highly distinct from other thrushes, instead being convergent to Corvoidea such as trillers (Lalage) or true orioles (Oriolus). Thus it is placed in a monotypic genus Chlamydochaera.

The fruithunter is not considered a threatened species by the IUCN.

References

Birds described in 1887
Endemic birds of Borneo
Turdidae
Taxonomy articles created by Polbot
Fauna of the Borneo montane rain forests